Sir James Mackey,  Chief Executive of Northumbria Healthcare NHS Foundation Trust, was appointed to be Chief Executive of NHS Improvement in October 2015 as a two-year secondment. He confirmed that he intended to return to Northumbria. He has resumed his post as Chief Executive at Northumbria Healthcare Trust in November 2017.

Born in Hebburn, South Tyneside, in 1966. He is a qualified accountant and joined the NHS in 1990.

He was reckoned by the Health Service Journal to be the seventh most influential person in the English NHS in 2015, and the third in 2016.

He was knighted in the 2019 New Years Honours List.

In 2021 he unsuccessfully applied to become NHS chief executive to succeed Simon Stevens, losing out in the open competition - alongside Dido Harding and Mark Britnell - to Amanda Pritchard.
In 2022 he was acted to lead the Elective recovery work for NHS England and remains one of the most influential figures in the NHS, ranked fifth of the Health Service Journal's most influential people in health.

References

Administrators in the National Health Service
English healthcare chief executives
Knights Bachelor
Living people
Year of birth missing (living people)